In Marxist theory and Marxian economics, the immiseration thesis, also referred to as emiseration thesis, is derived from Karl Marx's analysis of economic development in capitalism, implying that the nature of capitalist production stabilizes real wages, reducing wage growth relative to total value creation in the economy, leading to the increasing power of capital in society.

The immiseration thesis is related to Marx's analysis of the rising organic composition of capital and reduced demand for labor relative to capital equipment as technology develops.

Karl Marx 
In Karl Marx's early writings of the 1840s, he was influenced by David Ricardo's theory of wages, which held that wages tended down to a subsistence minimum. This was the "Iron law of wages" coined by the socialist Ferdinand Lassalle. In On the Question of Free Trade (1847), Marx wrote: "Thus, as means are constantly being found for the maintenance of labor on cheaper and more wretched food, the minimum of wages is constantly sinking."

This implied an absolute decline in living standards. However, Marx changed his position in the 1850s. In the first volume of Capital, chapter 25, section 4, he instead suggested a relative immiseration of workers vis-à-vis capital occurred. Concerning the evolution of the worker's conditions, he wrote:

Marx argued that, in accordance with the labour theory of value, capitalist competition would necessitate the gradual replacement of workers with machines, allowing an increase in productivity, but with less overall value for each product produced, as more products can be made in a given amount of time. This process forms part of the general law of capitalist accumulation, in which the proportion of "constant capital" increases relative to "variable capital" (i.e. workers) in the production process over time.  Marx also noted that this movement is not merely an abstract relation, but that it is a result of class struggle, and it could be temporarily stopped should wages dip below an amount that the proletariat deem acceptable.

Diverging views 
Raymond Geuss asks: "What if capitalism came to be capable of raising the standard of living of the workers rather than further depressing it? A trade union consciousness could then establish itself that was not inherently and irrevocably revolutionary, one that was itself, as Lenin claimed, a form of bourgeois ideology, that is, a form of consciousness that was itself a means through which the bourgeoisie could extend and solidify its domination over the working class."

Frankfurt School 

The immiseration thesis was equally questioned by later theorists, notably by early members of the Frankfurt School. For Theodor Adorno and Max Horkheimer, state intervention in the economy had effectively abolished the tension in capitalism between the "relations of production" and "material productive forces of society"—a tension which, according to traditional Marxist theory, constituted the primary contradiction within capitalism. The previously "free" market (as an "unconscious" mechanism for the distribution of goods) and "irrevocable" private property of Marx's epoch have gradually been replaced by the centralized state planning and socialized ownership of the means of production in contemporary Western societies. The dialectic through which Marx predicted the emancipation of modern society is thus suppressed, effectively being subjugated to a positivist rationality of domination: "[G]one are the objective laws of the market which ruled in the actions of the entrepreneurs and tended toward catastrophe. Instead the conscious decision of the managing directors executes as results (which are more obligatory than the blindest price-mechanisms) the old law of value and hence the destiny of capitalism."

Relative immiseration 
When it became clear that the conditions of the working class were not growing worse in objective terms (for example, wages continued to rise and living conditions improved), it was suggested that Marx did not believe the working class would be immiserated in absolute terms but rather in relative terms i.e. the worker would become more exploited. However, Neven Sesardic criticises this view on two grounds. Firstly, it is unclear if this is an empirical statement that can actually be examined, whereas absolute immiseration can be. Secondly, Sesardic argues that it is not clear Marx did mean relative immiseration; Sesardic observes that in the Communist Manifesto, Marx talks about the workers having nothing to lose but their chains, which is more in line with the view of absolute immiseration. Even by 1865 when Marx had moved towards a more scientific analysis, his work still implied absolute immiseration. However, in Marx's "Wage Labour and Capital," he states that worker wages may rise along with the rapid development of capital, but that relative immiseration still would increase.

See also 
 Capitalist mode of production (Marxist theory)
 Crisis theory
Critique of political economy
 Technological unemployment
 Unfree labour
 Wage labour
 Wage slavery

References 

Capitalism
Labour economics
Marxian economics
Socialism